The International Wood Products Journal is a quarterly peer-reviewed scientific journal covering all aspects of wood science, engineering, and technology. It is published by Taylor & Francis on behalf of the Wood Technology Society (Institute of Materials, Minerals and Mining) and the editor-in-chief is Gervais Sawyer. It was established in 1958 as the Journal of the Institute of Wood Science, obtaining its current name in 2010.

External links

The Wood Technology Society

Wood products
Materials science journals
Publications established in 1958
English-language journals
Taylor & Francis academic journals
Forestry journals
Quarterly journals